The Canton of Léré is a former canton situated in the Cher département and in the Centre region of France. It was disbanded following the French canton reorganisation which came into effect in March 2015. It consisted of 7 communes, which joined the canton of Sancerre in 2015. It had 5,960 inhabitants (2012).

Geography
A farming and forestry area in the arrondissement of Bourges. centred on the town of Léré. The altitude varies from 132m at Sainte-Gemme-en-Sancerrois to 303m at Léré, with an average altitude of 200m.

The canton comprised 7 communes:
Belleville-sur-Loire
Boulleret
Léré
Sainte-Gemme-en-Sancerrois
Santranges
Savigny-en-Sancerre
Sury-près-Léré

Population

See also
 Arrondissements of the Cher department
 Cantons of the Cher department
 Communes of the Cher department

References

Lere
2015 disestablishments in France
States and territories disestablished in 2015